Flying Buffalo Inc. (FBI) is a game company with a line of role playing games, card games, and other gaming materials. The company's founder, Rick Loomis, began game publishing with Nuclear Destruction, a play-by-mail game which started the professional PBM industry in the United States. Loomis added games and players while introducing computer moderation and soon incorporated into the company Flying Buffalo Inc. The company published games in other genres, including card games such as Nuclear War and a role playing game called Tunnels & Trolls, a game similar to Dungeons & Dragons. Flying Buffalo acquired its 10,000th customer account number in 1980 and reached its largest size of 21 employees in 1983.

In July 2021, Webbed Sphere bought Flying Buffalo with plans to incorporate Flying Buffalo's products. The PBM games were not included in the sale and were continued by a separate company called Rick Loomis PBM Games.

History
Flying Buffalo Inc. was founded in January 1970. That year, Rick Loomis invented a game called Nuclear Destruction, a play-by-mail game, for which he moderated multiplayer games. Nuclear Destruction started the professional PBM industry. He soon had more than 200 players involved across multiple games, and asked fellow soldier Steve MacGregor to write a computer program to help moderate the games; they started renting time on a computer near Fort Shafter, using the name Flying Buffalo devised by Loomis. 
 Loomis published the first issue of his bi-monthly magazine in September 1971—one two-sided page. Initially called The Flying Buffalo's Favorite Magazine, Loomis eventually renamed it to Flying Buffalo Quarterly. 

After leaving the military in 1972, Loomis and MacGregor incorporated their PBM company as Flying Buffalo, Inc., or FBI. Loomis and MacGregor pooled their savings to purchase a Raytheon 704 minicomputer to run turns for their PBM games. According to Loomis in 1971, the computer cost $15,000 and had "4000 words of memory ... a teletypewriter, and a paper [tape] reader/punch".  

Also in 1972, Loomis acquired and published Nuclear War; it soon became one of Flying Buffalo's best sellers. In 1975 they published Tunnels & Trolls, a fantasy role playing game generally similar to Dungeons & Dragons. Later products included background materials for fantasy role playing games, which became the "Catalyst" series. In 1976 the company started running a space exploration/conquest PBM game titled Starweb. In 1978 they purchased a board wargame titled Schutztruppe from game designer Jim Bumpas. Also in 1978 the company began publishing Sorcerer's Apprentice. The company's gross sales in 1978 was $125,000 with expenses at $130,000. 1979 brought some additional changes. Flying Buffalo's Vice President, Dave Slight, died, slowing PBM operations. The company purchased another Raytheon computer from a local doctor's office, which promised to speed printing by an order of magnitude (although it initially was missing some key required equipment).

In 1980, the company stated that it had more than 3,000 players worldwide. The staff reached its largest size of over 21 employees in 1983. The company also ran a gaming store at various locations in Tempe, Arizona until 1985. In 1985, Flying Buffalo reached a milestone, assigning its 10,000th account number. The company noted that, although account No. 1 went to its founder, Rick Loomis, account No. 10,000 went to a customer from Athens, Alabama. 

In 1992, the fiction book Mage's Blood and Old Bones: A Tunnels & Trolls Shared World Anthology was published by Flying Buffalo. Following the dissolution of TSR in 1997, Flying Buffalo remains the oldest pen-and-paper role-playing game publisher in the world. 

In July 2021, Webbed Sphere purchased Flying Buffalo Inc. with plans for Flying Buffalo to join its existing product lines. The PBM games were not included in the sale and a separate company, Rick Loomis PBM Games, continues to run nine PBM games originally published by Flying Buffalo, including Heroic Fantasy, Nuclear Destruction, Starweb, and others.

Play-by-mail games
Flying Buffalo noted in their 14-years history to 1985, some of their PBM games had been run hundreds of times each, including over 870 games of Starweb, 930 of Battle Plan, and 720 of Nuclear Destruction. The company was also up to No. 50 in its print run of Flying Buffalo Quarterly, its company magazine. The company published various play-by-mail games.

 Battle Plan
 Board of Directors
 Covert Operations
 Diplomacy
 Election Year
 Feudal Lords
 Galactic Conflict
 Heroic Fantasy

 Illuminati
 Lizards!
 Mobius I
 Moon Base
 Nuclear Destruction
 Nuclear War
 Raumkrieg
 Riftlords

 Riftwars
 Space Battle
 Starlord
 Starweb
 Time Trap
 Treacherous Trajan's Trap
 World Wide Battle Plan
 1939 World Wide Battle Plan

Other products
The company produced a range of unusual dice, such as a set to determine which toppings to order on pizza, and currently hold the printing rights to the Ace of Aces and Lost Worlds flip book systems.

Awards 
Various Flying Buffalo games have won awards.
 Ace of Aces. 1981 winner Charles Roberts/Origins Gamers Choice of 1980 and was inducted into the Adventure Gaming Hall of Fame in 1994.
 Citybook I, 1982
 Illuminati PBM game won best Play By Mail Game. 1990, 1991, 1992, 1993, 1994, and 1995 and was put in the Hall of Fame in 1997.
 Nuclear Proliferation, 1992
 Nuclear Escalation, Best Science Fiction Boardgame of 1983
 Stormhaven, Best Roleplaying Adventure of 1983
 Starweb, Best Play By Mail Game 1984, 1997, 2000, 2003, and 2006.
 Wargamers Information, 1990

The Origins Hall of Fame award is given to game designers who have the best contributions of their field. Multiple Flying Buffalo writers and designers have won this award.
 Rick Loomis, 1988.
 Michael Stackpole, 1993.
 Elizabeth T. Danforth, 1995.
 Ken St. Andre, 2018.

See also
 List of play-by-mail games

Notes

References

External links 
 
 

1970 establishments in Hawaii
Board game publishing companies
Card game publishing companies
Companies based in Scottsdale, Arizona
Play-by-mail game publishing companies
Publishing companies established in 1970
Role-playing game publishing companies